The Nias hill myna or Nias myna (Gracula robusta) is a member of the starling family. It is an endemic resident of Nias and other nearby islands off western Sumatra.  Clements lumps this species with the common hill myna.

Description
This large, stocky and superficially crow-like myna is the largest of the hill mynas and may be the largest living species in the starling family. The Nias hill myna has mainly purple-glossed black plumage. It has bright orange-yellow patches of naked skin and large fleshy yellow wattles on the side of its head and nape. There are large white wing patches, which are obvious in flight. The massive bill is mainly red and the strong legs are bright yellow.

Behaviour
This myna is arboreal and is found mainly in flocks in hill forests. Like most starlings, the Nias hill myna is fairly omnivorous, eating fruit, nectar and insects.

This bird is famous for its talking abilities and fetches a high price. It is under pressure from trapping for the illegal pet trade and from habitat destruction, since most indigenous forest has been destroyed. In a bird survey of Nias Island in 1990, Dymond failed to find any Nias hill mynas in a 17-day stay.

In 2015, Czech zoologists discovered several wild individuals, which were thought to be extinct in the wild for the past several years.

References

Dymond, N., A survey of the birds of Nias Island, Sumatra, Kukila 7: 10-27

Nias hill myna
Birds of Sumatra
Nias hill myna